Erik Isak Arvidsson (born 6 August 1992) is a Swedish former tennis player.

Arvidsson has a career high ATP singles ranking of 489 achieved on 17 November 2014. He also has a career high ATP doubles ranking of 183, achieved on 30 January 2017.

Arvidsson has represented Sweden at Davis Cup, where he has a win–loss record of 2–11.

He reached the quarterfinals of the 2016 Swedish Open partnering Fred Simonsson.

Futures and Challenger finals

Singles: 6 (4–2)

Doubles: 32 (25–7)

Davis Cup

Participations: (2–11)

   indicates the outcome of the Davis Cup match followed by the score, date, place of event, the zonal classification and its phase, and the court surface.

See also
List of Sweden Davis Cup team representatives

References

External links
 
 

Swedish male tennis players
Living people
1992 births
Sportspeople from Västra Götaland County
21st-century Swedish people